Six ships and one shore establishment of the Royal Navy have borne the name HMS Raleigh, after Sir Walter Raleigh:

 HMS Raleigh was a 32-gun fifth rate, previously the American . She was sold in 1783.
  was an 18-gun  launched in 1806. She was used as a target from 1839 and was sold in 1841.
  was a 50-gun fourth rate launched in 1845 and wrecked in 1857, due to striking an uncharted rock near Hong Kong.
 HMS Raleigh was to have been a wood screw frigate. She was ordered in 1860, but was cancelled in 1863.
  was an iron screw frigate launched in 1874 and sold in 1905.
  was a  heavy cruiser launched in 1919 and wrecked in 1922.
  is the current basic training establishment of the Royal Navy, in Torpoint.

See also
 

Royal Navy ship names